Cañal Bajo Carlos Hott Siebert Airport is an airport serving Osorno, a city in the Los Lagos Region of Chile.

Airlines and destinations

See also
Transport in Chile
List of airports in Chile

References

External links

Cañal Bajo Carlos - Hott Siebert Airport at OurAirports

Cañal Bajo Carlos Hott Siebert Airport at FallingRain
Aeródromo Cañal Bajo Carlos Hott Siebert (SCJO) at Aerodromo.cl

Airports in Los Lagos Region
Buildings and structures in Osorno, Chile